Martina Clausner is a German former figure skater who represented East Germany. She is the 1966 Prize of Moscow News champion, a two-time Blue Swords silver medalist, and a three-time East German national medalist, having won one silver and two bronze medals. She competed at three World Championships and three European Championships in the 1960s.

Clausner was coached by Jutta Müller. Her skating club was SC Karl-Marx-Stadt.

Competitive highlights

References 

20th-century births
German female single skaters
Living people
Sportspeople from Chemnitz
Year of birth missing (living people)
20th-century German women